was a Japanese engineer and economist. He was a Professor emeritus of Economics at University of California, Los Angeles.

Aoki earned a BA and MSc in Physics from the University of Tokyo, and a PhD in engineering from UCLA in 1960. He was a professor of engineering at UCLA and California–Berkeley from 1960–1974, before switching fields to economics in which he remained a professor until his retirement in 2002. Aoki's change of research areas is reflected in the two editions of his influential textbook, Optimization of Stochastic Systems. Originally published in 1967 it contained a rigorous treatment of optimal control methods in engineering, whereas the second edition (published in 1989) was amended by numerous applications in economics. He died on July 24, 2018, aged 87.

Selected publications
 
A revised edition:

References

External links 
 Website at UCLA

1931 births
2018 deaths
People from Hiroshima Prefecture
Japanese engineers
20th-century Japanese economists
21st-century Japanese economists
University of Tokyo alumni
UCLA Henry Samueli School of Engineering and Applied Science alumni
University of California, Los Angeles faculty
University of Illinois faculty
Academic staff of Osaka University
Academic staff of Tokyo Institute of Technology
Academic staff of Chuo University
Academic staff of Gifu Shotoku Gakuen University
Fellows of the Econometric Society